Eleodes grandicollis is a species of desert stink beetle in the family Tenebrionidae.

Subspecies
These subspecies belong to the species Eleodes grandicollis:
 Eleodes grandicollis grandicollis Mannerheim, 1843
 Eleodes grandicollis valida Boheman, 1858

References

Further reading

External links

 

Tenebrionidae